(1928 – 2 January 2018) was a Japanese researcher in the areas of translation studies and comparative literature. He was born in Tokyo and graduated from the University of Tokyo.

Works 

 Honnyakugo Seiritsu Jijou [翻訳語成立事情] (1982), Iwanami Shinsho

External links 
 Recent work by Akira Yanabu
 Modernization of Japanese Language by Akira Yanabu

1928 births
2018 deaths
Academics from Tokyo
Translation scholars
University of Tokyo alumni
Writers from Tokyo